Carry On Loving is a 1970 British comedy film, the 20th release in the series of 31 Carry On films (1958–1992). It features series regulars Sid James, Kenneth Williams, Charles Hawtrey, Joan Sims, Hattie Jacques, Terry Scott and Bernard Bresslaw alongside newcomers Richard O'Callaghan (in his first Carry On) and Imogen Hassall (in her only Carry On role). The dialogue veers toward open bawdiness rather than the evasive innuendo characteristic of the earlier films in the series. There are fictitious locations named for their sexual innuendo, including 'Much-Snogging-On-The-Green', 'Rogerham Mansions' and 'Dunham Road'.

Plot
Various events involve a dating agency run by Sid Bliss (Sid James) and his longtime girlfriend Sophie Plummett (Hattie Jacques). Their "Wedded Bliss" agency purports to bring together lonely hearts using computer-matching technology, but couples are actually paired up by Sophie. Bliss consistently avoids marrying Sophie, enthusiastically pursuing Esme Crowfoot (Joan Sims), a seamstress and client who consistently rejects his advances.

Percival Snooper (Kenneth Williams) becomes a client to find a wife for business reasons: as a confirmed bachelor, he is inept at his job as a marriage counsellor due to lack of personal experience. James Bedsop (Charles Hawtrey) is a private detective whom Sophie hires to spy on Sid's after-hours activities when he supposedly "vets" the female clients, including Esme.

Timid Bertram Muffet (Richard O'Callaghan) winds up with model Sally Martin (Jacki Piper) after the agency muddles his directions to a blind date. Client Terry Philpott (Terry Scott) suffers several failures in his dealings with the agency including a disastrous meeting with prim, sheltered Jenny Grubb (Imogen Hassall). Jenny moves in with Sally, undergoes a makeover, and becomes a model. Terry later finds romance with the "new" Jenny.

Percival's association with Sophie provokes his jealous housekeeper, dowdy Miss Dempsey (Patsy Rowlands), to reveal her seductive side. Esme's estranged lover, volatile wrestler Gripper Burke (Bernard Bresslaw), returns to cause havoc over an instance of mistaken identity.

Peter Butterworth appears in a one-minute cameo as a Bluebeard-esque character jokingly referred to as Dr. Crippen. He approaches Sid Bliss to find his third wife. His first wife died eating poisoned mushrooms, the second suffered a fractured skull because she "wouldn't eat the mushrooms."

Cast
Sid James as Sidney Bliss
Kenneth Williams as Percival Snooper
Charles Hawtrey as James Bedsop
Hattie Jacques as Sophie Bliss
Joan Sims as Esme Crowfoot
Bernard Bresslaw as Gripper Burke
Terry Scott as Terry Philpott
Jacki Piper as Sally Martin
Richard O'Callaghan as Bertrum Muffet
Imogen Hassall as Jenny Grubb
Patsy Rowlands as Miss Dempsey
Peter Butterworth as Sinister client
Bill Pertwee as Barman
Joan Hickson as Mrs Grubb
Julian Holloway as Adrian
Janet Mahoney as Gay
Ann Way as Victoria Grubb
Bill Maynard as Mr Dreery
Amelia Bayntun as Corset lady
Mike Grady and Valerie Shute as The Lovers
Anthony Sagar as Hospital Patient
Kenny Lynch as Bus Conductor

Crew

Producer – Peter Rogers
Director – Gerald Thomas

Filming and locations

Filming dates – 6 April-15 May 1970

Interiors:
 Pinewood Studios, Buckinghamshire

Exteriors:
 The streets of Windsor, Berkshire. The corner of Park Street and Sheet Street doubled for the Wedded Bliss Agency. This had been used a decade earlier for the Helping Hands Agency in Carry On Regardless.

Reception
It was the fourth-most popular film at the British box office in 1971.

David Parkinson contributed a retrospective review for Radio Times.  Awarding the film 2 out of 5 stars Parkinson said it was a patchy entry in the series which spent too much time with the other clients of the bureau at the expense of the proprietors and the characters played by Joan Sims and Kenneth Williams.

References

Bibliography

Keeping the British End Up: Four Decades of Saucy Cinema by Simon Sheridan (third edition) (2007) (Reynolds & Hearn Books)

External links 
 
Carry On Loving Location Guide at The Whippit Inn

1970 films
1970 romantic comedy films
British romantic comedy films
Loving
1970s English-language films
Films directed by Gerald Thomas
Films shot at Pinewood Studios
Films produced by Peter Rogers
1970s British films